Babule  is a village in the administrative district of Gmina Padew Narodowa, within Mielec County, Subcarpathian Voivodeship, in south-eastern Poland.

The village has a population of 260.

References

Babule